Black 7984, Food Black 2, or C.I. 27755, is a brown-to-black synthetic diazo dye. It is often used as the tetrasodium salt.

When used as a food dye, it has E number E152. Its use in food has not been permitted in the United States and in the European Union since 1984. It is also not permitted in Australia and Japan.

Black 7984 is also used in cosmetics.

See also
 Carbon black

References

Azo dyes
Food colorings
Acid dyes